Tomorrow Never Dies: Music from the Motion Picture is the soundtrack of the 18th James Bond film of the same name.

David Arnold composed the score of Tomorrow Never Dies, his first full Bond soundtrack. Arnold came to the producers' attention due to his successful cover interpretations in Shaken and Stirred: The David Arnold James Bond Project—which featured major artists performing classic James Bond title songs.

The theme tune was chosen through a competitive process. There were approximately twelve submissions; including songs from Swan Lee,
Pulp, Saint Etienne, Marc Almond, and Sheryl Crow. According to Nina Persson of Swedish pop group The Cardigans, they were also asked to submit a theme song candidate, but rejected the request due to exhaustion that would be exacerbated by the potential added workload; Persson has called her decision to turn down the offer "one of my biggest mistakes."

Crow's theme was eventually picked by Metro-Goldwyn-Mayer. In the meantime, a bold, brassy number in the classic John Barry/Shirley Bassey vein that Arnold himself wrote with David McAlmont and lyricist Don Black with the intent of being a theme, was relegated to the end credits with the title "Surrender". While McAlmont recorded the demo, "Surrender" was eventually recorded by k.d. lang after an extensive selective process.

The score itself follows Barry's classical style in both composition and orchestration, together with modern electronic rhythms present in most cues. Because the title song was changed so close to the film's release date, there was no time to work Crow's melody into any of the score. As a result, melody patterns from "Surrender" appear prominently many times in the score, mainly in the action cues, but it can also be heard in the dramatic "All in a Day's Work" track.

The DVD version of the film has an "isolated music track" allowing the viewer to watch the film with just the background music.

Scoring of the film had not been completed when the soundtrack was released so on  a second album was released by Chapter III Records which removed the theme songs, Moby's Bond theme remake and "Station Break", and had additional music, as well as an interview with David Arnold.

In 2022, La-La Land Records released a two-disc limited and expanded edition of the complete score by Arnold.

Track listing
All music was composed by David Arnold, except where noted. Cues in bold contain Monty Norman's James Bond Theme.

1997 release
 "Tomorrow Never Dies" – Sheryl Crow (4:50)
 "White Knight" (8:30)
 "The Sinking of the Devonshire" (7:07)
 "Company Car" (3:08)
 "Station Break" (3:30)
 "Paris and Bond" (1:55)
 "The Last Goodbye" (1:34)
 "Hamburg Break In" (2:52)
 "Hamburg Break Out" (1:26)
 "Doctor Kaufman" (2:26)
 "*-3-* Send" (1:17)
 "Underwater Discovery" (3:37)
 "Backseat Driver" – David Arnold and Alex Gifford of Propellerheads (4:37)
 "Surrender" – k.d. lang (Music by David Arnold and David McAlmont, Lyrics by Don Black) (3:56)
 "James Bond Theme" – Moby (3:12)

2000 release
 "White Knight" (8:29)
 "Sinking of the Devonshire" (7:06)
 "Company Car" (3:07)
 "Paris And Bond" (1:55)
 "Last Goodbye" (1:33)
 "Hamburg Break In" (2:53)
 "Hamburg Break Out" (1:24)
 "Doctor Kaufman" (2:27)
 "*-3-Send" (1:15)
 "Backseat Driver" (4:34)
 "Underwater Discovery" (3:36)
 "Helicopter Ride" (1:34)
 "Bike Chase" (6:44)
 "Bike Shop Fight" (2:42)
 "Kowloon Bay" (2:27)
 "Boarding the Stealth" (4:38)
 "A Tricky Spot for 007" (2:48)
 "All in a Day's Work" (5:09)
 "Exclusive David Arnold Interview" (11:02)

See also
 Outline of James Bond

References

Soundtrack albums from James Bond films
Soundtrack
1997 soundtrack albums
A&M Records soundtracks
David Arnold soundtracks